Teresa J. Ibach (née Heusman) is a member of the Nebraska Legislature for District 44 from Sumner, Nebraska. She was elected to the Nebraska Legislature on November 8, 2022.

Electoral history

References

Republican Party Nebraska state senators
21st-century American politicians
Living people
1961 births